Christopher T. Crane (born April 18, 1986) is a former American football quarterback who played for the Milwaukee Iron of the Arena Football League. He was signed by the Indianapolis Colts as an undrafted free agent in 2009. He played college football at Boston College.

Early years
Crane was a four-year starter for the Trinity Shamrocks. He holds the Trinity career records for completions (313), passing yards (4,320) and touchdown passes (45). During his senior season, Crane completed 101 of 170 passes for 1,291 yards, 17 passing touchdowns, and also had seven rushing touchdowns. Crane had a 31-11 overall record at quarterback and played in the 2003 Pennsylvania East-West All-Star Game.

Crane was a member of the Trinity basketball team that won the PIAA Class AA state championship in 2003, his junior season, and he totaled 1,483 career points.

College career
Crane was redshirted during the 2004 season at Boston College. In 2005, was the third-string quarterback behind Matt Ryan and Quinton Porter. He saw action in one game, completing three of four pass attempts for 42 yards and one rush for eight yards against Ball State.

Crane played eight games in 2006. He made his first career start on October 28, 2006  against the Buffalo Bulls, completing 17-of-26 pass attempts for 142 yards and one touchdown; added two rushing touchdowns against the Bulls. He also completed three of three pass attempts for nine yards against the Maine Black Bears and also completed two of three passes for 41 yards against the Duke Blue Devils.

Crane saw his first action of the 2007 season on September 22 against Army. He finished one of two passing for 15 yards in the game. His only other action of the season came on October 10 against Bowling Green, where he completed one of two passes for 13 yards.

Crane began 2008 as the Eagles number one quarterback, ahead of redshirt freshman Dominique Davis. He led the Eagles to a 3-1 start, with his first loss coming against Georgia Tech, 16-19. He then briefly improved the team's conference record by winning against North Carolina State and Virginia Tech, but lost the next two against North Carolina and Clemson. These losses were fueled by Crane's mediocre performance, but calls for his benching quickly ended when he led the team to a win against rival Notre Dame and to a win at Florida State during FSU's Senior Night. Crane's short time as the Boston College starter came to an end as he broke his collarbone against Wake Forest. The Eagles, under Dominique Davis, advanced and lost in the 2008 ACC Championship Game against Virginia Tech for a second year in a row.

Statistics

Professional career

Indianapolis Colts
After going undrafted in the 2009 NFL Draft, Crane was signed by the Indianapolis Colts as an undrafted free agent on May 3, 2009. He was released on July 28, but re-signed on August 10 after an injury to quarterback Jim Sorgi. Crane was waived again on August 22.

Milwaukee Iron
Crane spent the 2010 season as a member of the Milwaukee Iron. He completed 16 of 32 passes for 132 yards. He threw three touchdowns and no interceptions.

References

External links
Boston College Eagles bio
Indianapolis Colts bio

1986 births
Living people
People from Mechanicsburg, Pennsylvania
Players of American football from Pennsylvania
American football quarterbacks
Boston College Eagles football players
Indianapolis Colts players
Milwaukee Iron players